Sand Dollars is a 2014 internationally co-produced drama film directed by Laura Amelia Guzmán and Israel Cárdenas. It was screened in the Contemporary World Cinema section at the 2014 Toronto International Film Festival. It was selected as the Dominican entry for the Best Foreign Language Film at the 88th Academy Awards. In 2016, director Laura Amelia Guzmán announced she was working on a sequel called Noelí Overseas.

Plot
Noeli is a young Dominican woman working as an escort for tourists. She has a three-year relationship with Anne (Geraldine Chaplin) a much older French woman who buys her services. Despite their transactional relationship, Anne is in love with Noeli and Noeli plans to use her to get a visa to go to France then Barcelona to reconnect with her mother who has moved there.

While out with Anne, Noeli sees her boyfriend with another girl at a club. She angrily confronts him while Anne is in the washroom, but Anne sees the tail end of their fight. Anne leaves the club and Noeli tries to stop her from leaving. When it becomes clear that all Noeli wants is for Anne to pay their bar tab, Anne slaps her and leaves. On her way home, Noeli crashes her motorcycle, which is stolen as she lies injured beside the road.

Anne struggles for a few days as she does not hear from Noeli and thinks she has abandoned her. Noeli meanwhile does not want to go back to Anne and tells her boyfriend to start providing for them. As money runs out she returns to Anne and tells her she is pregnant. Anne accompanies her to get an ultrasound to see if her unborn child is hurt and together they see the sonogram. After their reunion Anne presents Noeli with a passport and visa so that they can go to France together. She confesses to a friend that she does not believe that Noeli will be happy in Paris and they will be able to return to the Dominican Republic soon.

Noeli's boyfriend learns she is pregnant and plans to have the child overseas. He asks her to stay and she declines going ahead with the preparations to leave with Anne.

The night of her departure Noeli's boyfriend comes to visit her. Noeli gathers up her passport, money and papers and leaves a sleeping Anne. She and her boyfriend drive away and she tells him she loves him.

Cast
 Geraldine Chaplin
 Yanet Mojica
 Ricardo Ariel Toribio

Development
Directors  Guzmán and Cárdenas based their script on the novel Sand Dollars by Jean-Noel Pancrazi. The original script, like the novel, was about two men, but the directors rewrote the script to feature two women after Geraldine Chaplin expressed interest in appearing in the film.

Yanet Mojica had never acted previously to appearing in the film but was selected based on the close resemblance of her life to that of the character she portrayed.

See also
 List of submissions to the 88th Academy Awards for Best Foreign Language Film
 List of Dominican submissions for the Academy Award for Best Foreign Language Film

References

External links
 

2014 films
2014 drama films
2014 LGBT-related films
Dominican Republic documentary films
Lesbian-related films
Bisexuality-related films
2010s Spanish-language films
Sex tourism
Works about prostitution in the Dominican Republic
Dominican Republic LGBT-related films